Carmen de Lirio (31 October 1926 – 4 August 2014) was a Spanish film actress.

Selected filmography
 The Evil Forest (1951)
 It Was She Who Wanted It! (1953)
 Peace Never Comes (1960)
 The Two Rivals (1960)
 Goliath Against the Giants (1961)
 The Wild Ones of San Gil Bridge (1966)
 Marquis de Sade: Justine (1969)
 The House of the Doves (1972)
 Clara is the Price (1975)
 The Cheerful Colsada Girls (1984)

References

Bibliography 
 Peter Cowie & Derek Elley. World Filmography: 1967. Fairleigh Dickinson University Press, 1977.

External links 
 

1926 births
2014 deaths
Spanish film actresses
People from Zaragoza